The following radio stations broadcast on AM frequency 1017 kHz:

China 
 CNR Ethnic Minority Radio in Changchun (during 14:00-19:00, using Korean)

Italy
 "Amica Radio Veneta" at Vigonza, Province of Padova, Veneto (transmits AM stereo)

Philippines
DWLC-AM, in Lucena City as Radyo Pilipinas
DXSN, in Surigao as Radyo Magbalantay
DXRR-AM, in Davao as Radyo Rapido

Tonga
A3Z

Lists of radio stations by frequency